Erik Jensen (born 15 July 1975) is a Greenlandic politician currently serving as the leader of Siumut and the former Minister of Mineral Resources and Labor. He is a strong proponent of the Greenland independence movement.

Political career
In the Kielsen V Cabinet, Erik Jensen served as the Minister of Mineral Resources and Labor. In October 2019, Jensen met with delegates from the United States to discuss initiatives of Greenland's resource sector.

In 2020, disputes within Siumut regarding the leadership of Kim Kielsen and his lack of involvement of local politicians in decision making processes came to a boiling point, and Jensen resigned from the government. In 2020, Jensen was elected the new party leader of Siumut, beating incumbent leader Kim Kielsen in a 39-32 margin. Jensen has had been trying to distinguish himself from Kielsen as more for Greenlandic independence. Traditionally, the leader of the ruling party also took the position as the Prime Minister of Greenland, however Prime Minister Kielsen has not confirmed how he would proceed with the results. Jensen so far has shown no intention to immediately compete for the position of Prime Minister.

Political positions
Erik Jensen seeks to continue work toward Greenlandic independence from Denmark. He supports establishing new trade relations with countries outside of the Danish Realm, such as China and the United States.

Jensen seeks to have the Naalakkersuisut take over responsibilities such as Greenland's foreign policy, trade, immigration, and veterinary control, all of which are currently controlled by Denmark.

When United States President Donald Trump proposed to buy Greenland from Denmark, Jensen responded that "Greenland is open for business, but we are not for sale."

References

Greenlandic politicians
Living people
1975 births
People from Sisimiut
Siumut politicians